Bodinayakanur (also shortened to Bodi) is a Town and a municipality in Theni district  in the state of Tamil Nadu, India.

Etymology
In early days, it was called by the name Thenkasiyampathi (Tamil: தென்காசியம்பதி). Later, the town was named as Bodayanayakkanur, after the person Bodayanayakkar, who ruled the place. Later it got transformed to Bodinayakanur.

Demographics

Population 
According to 2011 census, Bodinayakanur had a population of 75,676 with a sex-ratio of 1,018 females for every 1,000 males, much above the national average of 929. A total of 6,544 were under the age of six, constituting 3,334 males and 3,210 females. The average literacy of the town was 76.18%, compared to the national average of 72.99%. The town had a total of 20333 households. There were a total of 30,234 workers, comprising 1,117 cultivators, 6,602 main agricultural laborers, 621 in household industries, 18,623 other workers, 3,271 marginal workers, 89 marginal cultivators, 1,574 marginal agricultural laborers, 134 marginal workers in household industries and 1,474 other marginal workers.

Government and politics  
Bodinayakkanur (state assembly constituency) is part of Theni (Lok Sabha constituency).

In 2021 Tamil Nadu Legislative Assembly election former Tamil Nadu Chief Minister O. Panneerselvam was elected from Bodinayakanur Constituency. As of 2021 he is the Deputy Leader of the Opposition.

References 

Cities and towns in Theni district
Palayam